The 2011 British Champions Series represents the country's 35 top flat races.

The first race, the 2000 Guineas, was won by Frankel.

External links
 The British Champions Series Official Site

Flat races in Great Britain
British Champions Series
2011 in British sport